Diya Aur Toofan is a 1969 Pakistani, Urdu romantic comedy film which is Produced & Directed by Rangeela
It also stars Munawar Zarif, Naghma, Ejaz Durrani, Nadeem Baig and Agha Talish It tells a story of a woman who marries the man she falls in love with but who dies before the marriage could be consummated, she is then thrown out of her in laws because they find out she is pregnant.

Plot
Diya aur Toofan tells the story of a tourist who travels to Muree named Akbar {Ejaz Durrani} and who's also a painter. He falls in love with the daughter, Sabrah {Naghma} of the man he's living with as a paying guest.
Akbar convinces his mother that he wants to marry Sabrah and her only and the mother finally agree's.
But on the day of the wedding Akbar meets with an accident and they don't manage to consummate their marriage but she is thrown out of her in laws when they find out she is pregnant.

Sabrah leaves home and is saved by Nawab Sahib {Agha Talish} when she's nearly hit by a car. He takes Sabrah home and treats her as his daughter. Sabrah gives birth to a girl Salma {Rani}.

Salma is saved from a poisonous snake by no other than Akbar who she doesn't know is her father.

The films comedy is brilliantly acted out by {Rangeela} as Deewana and {Munawar Zarif} as Abdullah and stars many others in small roles such as {Nadeem Baig}.
DIYA AUR TOOFAN is a brilliant family movie and should been seen.
Description added by emjaykhan

Cast
 Rangeela -Deewana 
 Naghma - Sabrah
 Rani - Salma
 Ejaz - Akbar
 Munawar Zarif - Abdullah
 Zulfi
 Agha Talish - Nawab Sahib
 Nadeem Baig - Doctor

Hit song from this film
 "Gaa Meray Manwa Gaata Jaa Re" Sung and written by Rangeela, music by Kamal Ahmed.

References

External links
 Diya Aur Toofan - IMDB.com

1969 romantic comedy films
1969 films
1960s Urdu-language films
1969 comedy films
Pakistani buddy films
Pakistani romantic comedy films
Urdu-language Pakistani films